Lale Buttress (‘Rid Lale’ \'rid la-'le\ is the ice-covered buttress rising to 2069 m on the northwest side of Detroit Plateau on Davis Coast in Graham Land, Antarctica.  It is situated between tributaries to Wright Ice Piedmont, and has steep and partly ice-free southwest, northwest and northeast slopes.

The buttress is named after the settlement of Lale in Southern Bulgaria.

Location
British mapping in 1978.

Maps
British Antarctic Territory. Scale 1:200000 topographic map. DOS 610 Series, Sheet W 64 60. Directorate of Overseas Surveys, Tolworth, UK, 1978.
 Antarctic Digital Database (ADD). Scale 1:250000 topographic map of Antarctica. Scientific Committee on Antarctic Research (SCAR). Since 1993, regularly upgraded and updated.

Notes

References
 Bulgarian Antarctic Gazetteer. Antarctic Place-names Commission. (details in Bulgarian, basic data in English)
 Lale Buttress. SCAR Composite Gazetteer of Antarctica

External links
 Lale Buttress. Copernix satellite image

Mountains of Graham Land
Bulgaria and the Antarctic
Davis Coast